Saeed al-Qashash (1979 – June 6, 1999) was a Jordanian mass murderer who killed twelve people, including 11 members of his family in 1998.

Murders 
On June 10, 1998, Qashash killed his 19-year-old classmate, Atta Shalan, his mother, Thuria, his father, Armin, his two brothers, Mohammed and Mostafa, and four sisters, Karimeh, Wafa, Mervit, Insaf, a brother-in-law, and two nephews, ages two and three. The victims were each lured to his family home's basement and then shot in the back of the head with a 7mm pistol. Qashash piled up the bodies and covered them with blankets and carpets. He then sealed the basement with bricks and cement before fleeing. The murders occurred in the outskirts of Amman. Qashash was arrested two days later and confessed to the murders.

Trial and execution 
In November 1998, Qashash was tried for and convicted of 12 counts of premeditated murder. He pleaded with Judge Mohammed Ajamieh to spare his life, but was sentenced to death. Qashash did not react to the sentence.

Qashash was hanged shortly before dawn at Swaqa Prison, about 60 miles south of Amman, on June 6, 1999.

See also 

 List of rampage killers (familicides in Asia)

References 

1979 births
1999 deaths
Jordanian mass murderers
Jordanian people convicted of murder
Executed Jordanian people
People executed by Jordan by hanging
Massacres in 1998
Executed mass murderers